Ivan Ratkaj (22 May 1647 – 26 December 1683), also Ivan Rattkay, was a Croatian Jesuit missionary, explorer and cartographer. He wrote the first detailed description of the Tarahumara, a Native Mexican people.

Biography

Ratkaj was born in Ptuj (Duchy of Styria, now northeastern Slovenia) to the Ratkaj noble family, barons of Veliki Tabor. After graduating from the Gymnasium, he joined the Society of Jesus in 1664. There he studied philosophy and theology. When he graduated, his superiors wanted him to teach, but they eventually granted his wish and sent him to be a missionary in Mexico in 1680.

Ratkaj arrived at Veracruz in September 1680. In his reports, written in the form of a diary, he described his sea voyage to Mexico, the land route to the native province of Tarahumara in the north of Mexico (modern-day Mexican state of Chihuahua) and the customs and life of the Tarahumara people. He also drew a map of the region with missions and Spanish forts. 

Ratkaj provided the first ethnographic and geographic presentation of the Tarahumara. He learned the native language in a month and moved to Tutuaca, a mission in a poor mountainous area. His reports betray an open curiosity: he noted all kinds of details, not only of nature, but also of the natives and their life. He mostly tries to show the Tarahumara in an objective light. He presents the Tarahumara as a "mild and civilized" people as opposed to some neighboring tribes. But they are "fiercely addicted to magic" like other tribes. He describes his role as spreading God's name among the pagans. He also urged them to abstain from drinking and dissolution.

He died suddenly in Carichic, aged only 36. According to some sources, the Indians may have been given him poisoned water to drink, but his contemporaries do not confirm this.

References

Sources
 
 Na sprudu neznanoga žala (On the Beach of an Unknown Shore) - A radio play inspired by Ratkaj's  missionary work

Further reading

External links

 Izvješća iz Tarahumare (Reports from Tarahumara) - The 1998 edition of Ratkaj's report in Croatian, German and Latin; ed. by Mijo Korade; ArTresor naklada

1647 births
1683 deaths
Croatian Jesuits
Croatian emigrants to Mexico
Croatian explorers
17th-century Croatian people
People from Ptuj
Croatian Roman Catholic missionaries
Jesuit missionaries
Roman Catholic missionaries in New Spain
Croatian cartographers